Loynton is a hamlet on the A519 near the villages of Norbury, and Woodseaves in Staffordshire, England. It lies in the civil parish of Norbury.

Loynton Hall is believed to have been built around 1671 by the Higgins Burne family. Whilst there are very few houses and farms, the main feature of the hamlet is a nature reserve, Loynton Moss, which attracts ramblers regularly. Through the nature reserve runs the Shropshire Union Canal.
In 1947 still owned and lived in by SAMBROOKE ARTHUR HIGGINS BURNE.

There is a road bridge over the canal, carrying the A519, under which is reportedly the smallest telegraph pole with the most wires anywhere.

Hamlets in Staffordshire
Borough of Stafford